Hafizullah Qadami (born 20 February 1985) is an Afghan football player. He plays as a forward and has played football with Maiwand Kabul FC since 2003. Qadami is considered one of Afghanistan's best players. He has been very effective when he has played with the Afghanistan national football team.

International goals

External links

Afghan footballers
Living people
1985 births
Footballers from Kabul
Kabul Bank FC players
Association football forwards
Afghanistan international footballers